Neohaemonia is a genus of aquatic leaf beetles in the family Chrysomelidae. There are at least 4 described species in Neohaemonia.

Species
 Neohaemonia flagellata Askevold, 1988
 Neohaemonia melsheimeri (Lacordaire, 1845)
 Neohaemonia minnesotensis Askevold, 1988
 Neohaemonia nigricornis (Kirby, 1837)

References

 Riley, Edward G., Shawn M. Clark, and Terry N. Seeno (2003). "Catalog of the leaf beetles of America north of Mexico (Coleoptera: Megalopodidae, Orsodacnidae and Chrysomelidae, excluding Bruchinae)". Coleopterists Society Special Publication no. 1, 290.

Further reading

 Arnett, R.H. Jr., M. C. Thomas, P. E. Skelley and J. H. Frank. (eds.). (2002). American Beetles, Volume II: Polyphaga: Scarabaeoidea through Curculionoidea. CRC Press LLC, Boca Raton, FL.
 Arnett, Ross H. (2000). American Insects: A Handbook of the Insects of America North of Mexico. CRC Press.
 Richard E. White. (1983). Peterson Field Guides: Beetles. Houghton Mifflin Company.

External links

 NCBI Taxonomy Browser, Neohaemonia

Donaciinae